NGC 935 and IC 1801 are a pair of interacting galaxies within the Aries constellation. NGC 935 is the northern member of the pair and IC 1801 is the southern.

References

External links
 
 Image ARP 276
 

Spiral galaxies
Interacting galaxies
Aries (constellation)
0935
IC objects
01936
276
+03-07-015 +03-07-016
009388